Gülistü Kadin, called also Gülüstü Kadin, Gülistu Hanim or Gülüstu Hanim ("rose in garden" or "above rose"; born Princess Fatma Chachba; 1830 -  1861) was a consort of Sultan Abdulmejid I, and the mother of Sultan Mehmed VI, the last Sultan of the Ottoman Empire.

Life
Born as Fatma Chachba, Gülistü Kadin was a member of the Abkhazian princely family, Shervashidze. Her father was Prince Tahir Bey Chachba. She was the granddaughter of Kelesh Ahmed-Bey Shervashidze, head of state of the Principality of Abkhazia. She was described as a tall woman.

Gülistü married Abdulmejid in 1854, and was given the title of "Fourth Ikbal", and, in 1860, of "Fourth Kadın". On 26 February 1855 She give birth two twins daughters, Zekiye and Fehime Sultan. On 30 July 1856, she gave birth to her third child, a daughter, Mediha Sultan. Five years later on 14 January 1861, she gave birth to her fourth child, a son, Şehzade Mehmed Vahideddin (future Mehmed VI). She was the favorite daughter-in-law of Bezmiâlem Sultan.

Death
She died in 1861, shortly after the birth of her last child. She was buried in her own mausoleum located in Fatih Mosque, Fatih, Constantinople, today in Istanbul. 

After her death, her daughter Mediha Sultan was entrusted in the care of Verdicenan Kadın, and her son Mehmed was entrusted in the care of Şayeste Hanım.

Having she died before her son ascended the throne, she was never Valide sultan.

Issue

In literature
Gülistü is a character in Hıfzı Topuz's historical novel Abdülmecit: İmparatorluk Çökerken Sarayda 22 Yıl: Roman (2009).

See also
Ikbal (title)
Ottoman Imperial Harem
List of consorts of the Ottoman sultans

References

Sources

Concubines of the Ottoman Empire
1831 births
1865 deaths
19th-century people from the Ottoman Empire
Infectious disease deaths in Turkey
Nobility of Georgia (country)
Princesses from Georgia (country)
People from the Ottoman Empire of Abkhazian descent
House of Shervashidze
Deaths from cholera
Consorts of Abdulmejid I
Mothers of Ottoman sultans